Silver Cloud may refer to:

Aircraft
Striplin Silver Cloud, ultralight aircraft

Automobiles
 Rolls-Royce Silver Cloud, the main car manufactured by Rolls-Royce from April 1955 until March 1966

Ships
 Silver Cloud (ship), a passenger cruise ship that entered service in 1994
 USS Silver Cloud, the name of more than one United States Navy ship
 Silver Cloud (yacht), a SWATH yacht owned by Alex Dreyfoos

Songs
 "Silver Cloud" (song), a single from La Düsseldorf's 1976 debut album

Animals
 Silver Cloud (horse), a racehorse
 Egira conspicillaris, a moth of the family Noctuidae